Les Basques (the Basques) is a regional county municipality in the Bas-Saint-Laurent region in eastern Quebec, Canada. It is located on the south bank of the Saint Lawrence River halfway between Rimouski and Rivière-du-Loup.

The county seat is in Trois-Pistoles.

Subdivisions
There are 12 subdivisions within the RCM:

Cities & Towns (1)
Trois-Pistoles

Municipalities (8)
Notre-Dame-des-Neiges
Saint-Clément
Sainte-Rita
Saint-Guy
Saint-Jean-de-Dieu
Saint-Mathieu-de-Rioux
Saint-Médard
Saint-Simon-de-Rimouski

Parishes (2)
Sainte-Françoise
Saint-Éloi

Unorganized Territory (1)
Lac-Boisbouscache

Demographics

Population

Language

Transportation

Access Routes

Highways and numbered routes that run through the municipality, including external routes that start or finish at the county border:

Autoroutes
None

Principal Highways

Secondary Highways

External Routes
None

See also
 List of regional county municipalities and equivalent territories in Quebec

References

Regional county municipalities in Bas-Saint-Laurent
Census divisions of Quebec